Fred Parker is a former ice hockey coach. A graduate of St. Francis Xavier University (1989), Fred has divided his career among many teams at varying levels, including serving as Clarkson's interim head coach after the firing of Mark Morris in 2002.

Head coaching record

College

† Parker was a midseason replacement

References

External links

Fred Parker's career statistics at Elite Prospects

Living people
Calgary Flames scouts
Clarkson Golden Knights men's ice hockey coaches
Year of birth missing (living people)